The Statute of Cambridge 1388 (12 Rich. 2, ch. 7) was a piece of English legislation that placed restrictions on the movements of labourers and beggars. It prohibited any labourer from leaving the hundred, rape, wapentake, city, or borough where he was living, without a testimonial, showing reasonable cause for his departure, to be issued under the authority of the justices of the peace. Any labourer found wandering without such letter, was to be put in the stocks until he found surety to return to the town from which he came. Impotent persons were to remain in the towns in which they were living at the time of the Act; or, if the inhabitants were unable or unwilling to support them, they were to withdraw to other towns within the hundred, rape, or wapentake, or to the towns where they were born.

It is often regarded as that the first Act for the Relief of the Poor, for within its many restrictions each county "Hundred" was made responsible for relieving its own "impotent poor" who, because of age or infirmity, were incapable of work. However, lack of enforcement limited its effect.

See also
 Internal passport

Notes

Begging
English Poor Laws
Acts of the Parliament of England
1380s in law
1388 in England
Economy of medieval England